, is a private university in Ginowan, Okinawa, Japan. The predecessor of the school was founded in 1959, and it was chartered as a university in 1972. The current President is Eiken Maetsu.

Alumni 

 Ryo Kiyuna (born 1990), Japanese karateka

External links
 Official website

Educational institutions established in 1959
Private universities and colleges in Japan
Universities and colleges in Okinawa Prefecture
1959 establishments in Okinawa